KLWR (101.9 FM) is a radio station licensed to North Rock Springs, Wyoming, United States. The station is currently owned by Educational Media Foundation and broadcasts EMF's K-Love contemporary Christian programming.

References

External links
 
 

LWR (FM)
Radio stations established in 2011
2011 establishments in Wyoming
Educational Media Foundation radio stations
K-Love radio stations